Orange Street station may refer to:
 Orange Street station (Newark Light Rail), a light rail station in Newark, New Jersey
 The western terminus stop of SEPTA Route 101